The Melbourne Derby is an intra-city local derby in Australia's premier soccer competition, the A-League Men. It is contested between the first two Melbourne teams playing in the competition, Melbourne City and Melbourne Victory, and is the A-League Men's first intra-city derby.

History
With the introduction of Melbourne Heart (who would later be known as Melbourne City) to the A-League at the start of the 2010–11 season, (the Victory having joined the league at inception), the first derby was held on 8 October 2010 at AAMI Park. The match was originally scheduled for 2 October 2010. However, due to the 2010 AFL Grand Final Replay occurring on the same day, the match was postponed.

Melbourne City won the inaugural derby 2–1, with goals from Alex Terra and John Aloisi. Robbie Kruse scored for Victory. Aziz Behich was sent off late in the second half, but Heart were able to hold on and secure the win. Although the game was an official sell out, only 25,897 fans turned up, well short of AAMI Park's official capacity of 30,050. The Victory hosted their first home derby on 22 January at Docklands Stadium, with the match ending in a 2–2 draw. The match was marred by an unacceptable tackle by Kevin Muscat on Adrian Zahra, which earned the Victory captain his second straight red card and a subsequent eight-match ban, ending not only his season, but his A-League career.

The first scoreless draw in the derby occurred in the third round of 2011–12 season, whilst a record crowd at AAMI Park was in attendance for the second derby of the season. This derby was arguably one of the best in the rivalry's brief existence, with Heart midfielder Matt Thompson scoring twice in a matter of minutes late in the first half to put Heart in the lead 2–1, before City substitute Alex Terra scored controversially after appearing to handball preceding his goal in the second half. City would win the match 3–2. The intense rivalry and passion between both sets of supporters occasionally boiled over, as occurred in February 2011 when four Melbourne City supporters were charged with "conspiracy to falsely imprison a [Victory supporter] ".

In the 2014–15 season, City underwent a takeover by the City Football Group. Melbourne City had their first derby win under the new management that season, winning the pre-Christmas derby 1–0 with Erik Paartalu scoring one of the latest winners in a derby. Victory and City later met in the Finals Series for the first time, in front of a derby record attendance of 50,873 at Etihad Stadium. Melbourne Victory won the Semi Final convincingly with a score of 3–0, with goals from Besart Berisha, Kosta Barbarouses and Archie Thompson. The third derby of the 2015–16 season was marred by a series of flares let off both outside AAMI Park before the match and inside the arena during the match by some Melbourne Victory supporters. The poor behaviour from Victory fans also extended to "an alleged assault on TV news personnel outside the stadium, throwing missiles at Melbourne City player Thomas Sørensen and a Victoria Police officer, and altercations with police after the match". Football Federation Australia subsequently issued Melbourne Victory a $50,000 club fine and a suspended three competition points deduction. On the field, the match was lauded as one of the most "captivating" derbies of the rivalry and featured an incredible passage of play for a goal from City striker Bruno Fornaroli. In Round 2 of the 2016–17 season, City recorded just their second ever derby win at Etihad Stadium, comfortably defeating Victory 4–1. The match featured the A-League Men debut of Socceroos all-time leading goal scorer Tim Cahill for City, who scored an incredible long-range goal to open City's account. The February 2017 derby was a spiteful and controversial affair. Most notably City goalkeeper Dean Bouzanis, was suspended and forced to undergo an education course after ethnically slurring Victory striker Besart Berisha during the late stages of Victory's 2–1 win. Tim Cahill was also red carded before even being entering the field of play, and Victory held on to record a stunning come from behind win.

The two rivals have been drawn for an FFA Cup derby only once; in 2016 at the semi-final stage of the tournament. Melbourne City advanced to the Final, knocking out Victory 2–0 in what was one of the most physically confrontational clashes between the two rivals. The game was not without controversy, with Melbourne City's first goal of the match allowed to stand, despite the fact that Tim Cahill had seemingly interfered with Lawrence Thomas's line of sight whilst in an offside position.

In the nine matches played from the start of the 2017–18 season to the end of the 2019–20 season, the teams shared three wins, three draws and three losses respectively, indicating a period of relative evenness between the rivals. This changed in the first two derbies of the 2020–21 season, when City claimed historic record wins in the fixture's history, defeating Victory firstly by six goals to nil in March 2021 and then by seven goals to nil the following month. Jamie Maclaren became the first player to score more than three goals in a derby in the latter game and the second player in league history to score five goals in a match, after Archie Thompson scored five goals in the 2007 A-League Grand Final. The results, which coincided with a torrid run of form for the Victory that left them in last place on the ladder, resulted in the sacking of head coach Grant Brebner on 17 April 2021.
	
On 12 December 2022, just a few days before the derby, the Australian Professional Leagues announced an agreement with Destination NSW that would see the 2023, 2024, and 2025 A-League Men Grand Finals hosted in Sydney, as opposed to the traditional format of being hosted by the finalist that finished higher during the regular season. This announcement was met with widespread opposition from fans, former players and active support groups, with Original Style Melbourne and Melbourne City Terrace, the active supporter groups of Melbourne Victory and Melbourne City respectively, agreeing to stage a walkout in the 20th minute of the Melbourne Derby on 17 December 2022 in order to protest against the APL's decision. 

The match was marred with poor crowd behaviour, with multiple flares ignited and thrown onto the pitch by supporters of both teams. In the 20th minute of the match, Melbourne City goalkeeper Tom Glover threw back a flare sent from the crowd, sparking a pitch invasion which saw both Glover and referee Alex King assaulted by pitch invaders, and causing the match to be abandoned. In response. Football Australia sanctioned Melbourne Victory, which included a stopping of ticket sales and closure of active support for their following two matches at AAMI Park, along with bans on Victory supporters attending their following two matches outside of Melbourne. Football Australia has also contemplated forcing Melbourne Victory to play the remainder of the 2022–23 season without fans.

Matches

2010–2020

2021–present

Statistics

Top goalscorers

 Players in bold are still active for their club.

Records
Most wins: Melbourne Victory (15)
Biggest win: Melbourne City 7–0 Melbourne Victory (17 April 2021)
Most consecutive wins: 3, Melbourne Victory (7 February 2015 – 17 October 2015), Melbourne City (7 February 2020 – 17 April 2021)
Most consecutive matches undefeated: 6, Melbourne City (7 February 2020 – 19 March 2022)
Most consecutive games without a draw: 8, (21 December 2013 – 19 December 2015, 15 October 2016 – 20 October 2018)
Most consecutive draws: 3, (22 December 2018 – 21 December 2019, 6 June 2021 – 19 March 2022)
Highest goalscorer: 10, Jamie Maclaren
Highest goalscorer in one match: 5, Jamie Maclaren (17 April 2021)
Player with most consecutive matches scored: 4, Besart Berisha (7 February 2015 – 19 December 2015)
Highest attendance: 50,873 (8 May 2015)
Lowest attendance (excluding behind closed doors): 11,467 (6 March 2021)

Honours

Players who played for both clubs

Correct as of 5 May 2022

See also
 Sydney Derby

Notes

References

Australian soccer rivalries
Melbourne Victory FC
Melbourne City FC
Sports competitions in Melbourne

pl:Mecze derbowe w A-League